Kartika Purnima is a Hindu, Sikh and Jain cultural festival that is celebrated on Purnima (full moon day), the 15th (or 30th) lunar day of the month of Kartika. It falls in November or December of the Gregorian calendar and is also known as Tripurari Purnima or Deva-Deepawali, the gods' festival of lights. Karthika Deepam is a related festival that is celebrated in South India and Sri Lanka on a different date.

Significance

Radha-Krishna 
In Vaishnavite tradition, this day is considered significant and special for the worship of both Radha and Krishna. It is believed that on this day, Radha-Krishna performed Raslila with their Gopis. At Jagannath Temple, Puri and all other Radha-Krishna temples, a sacred vow is observed throughout Kartika, and performances of Raslila are organized on the day of Kartik Purnima. According to other legends, Krishna worshipped Radha on this day.

Shiva 
'Tripuri Purnima' or 'Tripurari Purnima' derives its name from Tripurari – the foe of the demon Tripurasura. In some legends of Kartik Purnima, the term is used to denote the three demon sons of Tārakāsura. Tripurari is an epithet of the god Shiva. Shiva in his form as Tripurantaka ("Killer of Tripurasura") killed Tripurasura on this day. Tripurasura had conquered the whole world and defeated the gods and also created three cities in space, together called "Tripura". The killing of the demon(s) and destruction of his/their cities with a single arrow by Shiva overjoyed the gods, and they declared the day as a festival of illuminations. This day is also called "Deva-Diwali"—the Diwali of the gods.

Tulsi and Vishnu 
Kartik Purnima is also celebrated as the birth anniversary of Matsya, the god Vishnu's fish incarnation (avatar) and Vrinda, the personification of the Tulsi.

Kartikeya 
In Southern India, Kartik Purnima is also celebrated as the birthday of Lord Kartikeya, the god of war and elder son of Shiva. This day is also dedicated to the pitrs, dead ancestors.

Guru Nanak 
In Sikhism, Kartik Purnima is celebrated as the birthday of the famous Sikh preceptor Guru Nanak. Underhill believes that the origins of this festival may lie in ancient times, when a sacrifice called Shakamedhah was performed to attain victory over enemies.

The festival has even more significance when the day falls in the Nakshatra (lunar mansion) of Krittika and is then called Maha Kartik. If the nakshatra is Bharani, the results are stated to be special. If it is Rohini, then the fruitful results are even more. Any philanthropic act on this day is supposed to bring benefits and blessings equal to the performing of ten yajnas.

Hindu rituals
Kartik Purnima is closely associated with Prabodhini Ekadashi, which marks the end of Chaturmas, a four-month period when Vishnu is believed to sleep. Prabodhini Ekadashi signifies the awakening of the god. Chaturmas penance ends on this day. Many fairs that begin on Prabodhini Ekadashi end on Kartik Purnima, Kartik Purnima usually being the most important day of the fair. Fairs that conclude on this day include Prabodhini Ekadashi celebrations at Pandharpur and Pushkar Fair. Kartik Purnima is also the last day to perform the Tulsi Vivah ceremony, which can be performed from Prabodhini Ekadashi.

Also, it is believed that on this day, Vishnu returns to his abode after completing his stay in Bali, another reason why the day is known as Deva-Diwali.

In Pushkar, Rajasthan, the Pushkar Fair or Pushkar mela commences on Prabodhini Ekadashi and continues till Kartik Purnima, the latter being the most important. This fair is held in honour of the god Brahma, whose temple stands at Pushkar. A ritual bath on Kartik Purnima in the Pushkar Lake is considered to lead one to salvation. It is believed circling the three Pushkars on Kartik Purnima is highly meritorious. Sadhus gather here and stay from Ekadashi to full moon day in caves. About 200,000 people and 25,000 camels assemble in Pushkar for the fair. Pushkar fair is Asia's largest camel fair.

A ritual bath at a tirtha (a sacred water body like a lake or river) at a pilgrimage centre is prescribed on Kartik Purnima. This holy bath is known as "Kartik snana". A holy bath at Pushkar or in the Ganges river, especially at Varanasi is deemed as most auspicious. Kartik Purnima is the most popular day for bathing in the Ganges at Varanasi. The devotees also take a bath in the evening during moonrise and offer worship by way of six prayers such as Shiva sambuti, Satait and so forth.

Annakuta, an offering of food to the deities, is held in temples. People who have taken vows on Ashvin Purnima end them on Kartika Purnima. Lord Vishnu is also worshipped on this day. Any form of violence (hinsa or himsa) is prohibited on this day. This includes shaving, hair-cutting, cutting of trees, plucking of fruits and flowers, cutting of crops and even sexual intercourse. Charity especially donation of cows, feeding of Brahmins, fasting are religious activities prescribed for Kartik Purnima. Giving gift of gold is said to fulfill all desires of people.

Tripuri Purnima is only next to Maha Shivaratri amongst festivals dedicated to Shiva worship. To commemorate the killing of Tripurasura, images of Shiva are carried in procession. Temple complexes in southern India are lit up throughout the night. Deepmalas or towers of lights are illuminated in temples. People place 360 or 720 wicks in temples, to secure escape from hell after death. The 720 wicks symbolize the 360 days and nights of the Hindu calendar. In Varanasi, the ghats come alive with thousands of diyas (brightly lit earthen lamps). People gift lamps to priests. The lamps are kept throughout the night in houses and Shiva temples. This day is also known as "Kartik Diparatna" - the jewel of lamps in Kartik. Lights are also floated in miniature boats in rivers. Lights are placed under Tulsi, Sacred fig and Amla trees. The lights in the water and under trees are believed to help fishes, insects and birds who saw the light to attain salvation.

In Telugu households of Andhra Pradesh and Telangana, Karthika Maasalu (month) is considered very auspicious. The Kartika month starts on the day after Deepawali according to the (amanta tradition). From that day till the end of the month, oil lamps are lit every day. On Karthika Purnima, oil lamps with 365 wicks prepared at home are lit in Lord Shiva temples. Apart from that, Kartika Puranam is read, and fasting is observed till sunset, every day for the whole month.
Swaminarayan Sampraday also celebrates this day with faith and fervor.

Boita Bandana

In Odisha, on Kartik Purnima, people celebrate Boita Bandana (Odia: ବୋଇତ ବନ୍ଦାଣ  boita bandāṇa), in memory of ancient maritime trades via Kalinga by heading for the nearest water body to set afloat miniature boats, originally made out of banana stem and coconut stick, lit with Deepak (lamps), fabric, betel leaves. Boita stands for boat or ship. The festival is a mass commemoration of the state's glorious maritime history when it was known as Kalinga and tradesmen and mariners known as sadhabas traveled on boitas to trade with distant island nations that share borders with the Bay of Bengal like Indonesia, Java, Sumatra and Bali.

During Kartik month, the entire Hindu population of Odisha becomes strictly vegetarian. They observe the month with auspicious customs, continuing till the traditional ceremony of Panchuka which falls on the last five days of the month.  The Kartika month ends on Kartika Purnima. The day after Kartika Purnima is called Chhada Khai when the non-vegetarian people can again start their normal diet. By the way, the most fascinating part of Kartika Purnima in Odisha is the celebration of historic Boita Bandana to commemorate the Bali Jatra commenced by ancient Kalinga merchants and associated fleet to do trade in far South East Asia like Bali, Indonesia etc.

Karthika Deepam

In Tamil Nadu, Karthika Deepam is celebrated where the Purnima corresponds to the Krittika nakshatra. People light rows of lamps on their balconies. In Tiruvannamalai, a ten-day annual festival is held to celebrate Karthika Deepam.

Jainism

Kartik Purnima is an important religious day for Jains who celebrate it by visiting Palitana a Jain pilgrimage centre. Thousands of Jain pilgrims flock to the foothills of Shatrunjay hills of Palitana taluka on the day of Kartik Purnima to undertake the auspicious yatra (journey). Also known as the Shri Shantrunjay Teerth Yatra, this walk is an important religious event in the life of a Jain devotee, who covers 216 km of rough mountainous terrain on foot to worship at the Lord Adinath temple atop the hill.

Considered to be a very auspicious day for Jains, the day also assumes more significance for the walk, as the hills, which are closed to the public during the four months of Chaturmas, are thrown open for the devotees on Kartik Purnima. The day of Kartik Purnima is very significant in Jainism. As devotees are kept away from worshipping their lord for four months of the monsoon season, the first day attracts the maximum number of devotees. Jains believe that Adinath, the first tirthankara, sanctified the hills by visiting it to deliver his first sermon. According to Jain texts, millions of sadhus and Sadhvis have attained salvation on these hills.

Sikhism
Kartik Purnima is celebrated as Gurupurab or Prakash Parva of Sri Guru Nanak Dev, the first Guru of the Sikhs. Bhai Gurdas, Sikh Theologist within his Kabitt has testified that Guru Nanak was born on this day. This, it is known worldwide as Guru Nanak Jayanti and is also a public holiday in India.

See also
 Dev Deepawali (Varanasi)
 List of Hindu festivals

References

External links
Details about kartika purnima with wish
Significance of Kartik Purnima

Hindu holy days
Hindu festivals
Jain festivals
Religious festivals in India
Religious festivals in Nepal
October observances
November observances
Observances held on the full moon
December observances
Hindu festivals in India
Hindu festivals in Nepal